The chapelle royale (chapel royal) was the musical establishment attached to the royal chapel of the French kings. The term may also be applied to the chapel buildings, the Chapelle royale de Versailles.

The establishment included a choir, organist and instrumentalists and was separate from the musique du chambre which performed secular music.

Maîtres and sous-maîtres of the Chapelle Royale

During the reign of Louis XII (1498–1515) 
 Josquin des Prez premier chantre de la chapelle de Louis XII
In 1511 Louis XII decided the responsibilities of the treasurer of the Sainte-Chapelle and the master of the chapelle royale. The death, and sumptuous 40-day funeral of Louis' wife, Anne of Brittany in 1514 marks the origin of a unified chapelle royale combining the chapels of both Louis and Anne. Though at Anne's funeral the two chapels sang separately for the last time. Louis' Chapelle du Roi led by Antoine de Févin, included Johannes Prioris, Costanzo Festa, and Antoine de Longueval but not Jean Braconnier (died 1512). Anne's Chapelle de la Reine led by Antoine Divitis included Jean Mouton, Jean Richafort, Claudin de Sermisy, and Pierre Moulu.

François I (1515–1547)
 François I inherited all 29 singers of the combined chapels of Louis and Anne. Claudin de Sermisy, who was earlier noted as clerc musicien of the Sainte-Chapelle in 1508, and in 1515 as a member of the Chapelle Royale under Louis II, from 1532 became sous-maître of the chapelle of François I.

Henri II (1547–1559), François II (1559–1560)
 Pierre Certon (died 1572).

Charles IX (1560–1574), Henri III (1574–1589), Henri IV, Bourbon (1589–1610) 
Henri IV was the king whom legend tells said "Paris is worth a Mass."
 Eustache du Caurroy maître de la chapelle du roi
 Nicolas Morel
 Estienne Le Roy

During the reign of Louis XIII (1610–1643)
 Eustache Picot
 Nicolas Formé, sous-maître from 1609 to 1638
 Jacques Blondin, maitre de la chapelle royale de Paris

During the reign of Louis XIV (1643–1715) "The Sun King"
 Jean Veillot, sous-maître from 1643 to 1662
 Thomas Gobert, sous-maître from 1654 to 1668.
 Henry Du Mont (1610–1684), sous-maître from 1663 to 1683; compositeur from 1672.
 Pierre Robert (composer) (c. 1615 – 1699), sous-maître from 1663 to 1683; compositeur from 1672.
 Nicolas Le Prince.

On the 1683 retirement of Henry Du Mont and Pierre Robert the position of maître of the chapelle was divided into four positions:
 Pascal Collasse (1649–1709), sous-maître from 1683 to 1704, assistant to Lully until 1683, when he won one of the four seasonal assignments into which the Chapelle Royale directorship had been divided. His later years were devoted to alchemy.
 Michel Richard Delalande (1657–1726), sous-maître from 1683 to 1723.
 Nicolas Goupillet (1650–1713), sous-maître from 1683 - but in 1693 dismissed for plagiarism of Henri Desmarest.
 Guillaume Minoret, sous-maître from 1683 to 1714

Louis XV (1715–1774)
 Charles-Hubert Gervais (1671–1744), In 1721 named one of four sous-maîtres
 André Campra, sous-maître from 1721
 Nicolas Bernier (1664–1734), sous-maître from 1721
 Anne Danican Philidor (1681–1728) sous-maître from 1723.
 Henry Madin (1698–1748), sous-maître
 Jean-Joseph Cassanéa de Mondonville, maître de musique de la chapelle du roi. Acquired the reversion of André Campra's post in 1740, acceded to the position itself on 4 March 1744 on the death of Charles-Hubert Gervais.

1761 Four posts reduced to two.
 Esprit Antoine Blanchard (1696–1770)
 abbé Charles Gauzargues (1725–1799)
 Julien Amable Mathieu (1734–1811)

During the reign of Louis XVI (1774–1792)
 François Giroust

Chapelle de l'Empereur (1804–1814)
 Jean-François Le Sueur

Louis XVIII (1815–1824), Charles X (1824–1830), Louis XIX (1830), Henry V (1830)
 Luigi Cherubini from 1816, directeur

Louis Philippe I (1830–1848), Second Empire (1852–1870)
 Daniel François Esprit Auber succeeded Cherubini and then was maître de chapelle of Napoléon III from 1852.

Organists
 François d'Agincourt
 Guillaume-Antoine Calvière (1685–1755)
 François Couperin, organist (January trimester) from 1693 to 1730
 Jean Buterne, (April trimester)
 Guillaume-Gabriel Nivers, organist (July trimester)
 Nicolas Lebègue, (October trimester)
 Jacques Thomelin
 Jean-Baptiste Buterne
 Gabriel Garnier
 Louis Marchand
 Jean-François Dandrieu
 Nicolas-Hubert Paulin
 Louis-Claude Daquin
 Pierre-Claude Foucquet, succeeded François d'Agincourt in 1758
 Jean Landrin
 Claude-Bénigne Balbastre
 Armand-Louis Couperin
 Jean-Jacques Le Bourgeois
 Pierre-Louis Couperin
 Nicolas Séjan

See also
La Chapelle Royale founded in 1977 in Paris by the Belgian conductor Philippe Herreweghe.

References

French music